Seetharama Kalyanam may refer to:
 Seeta Rama Kalyanam (1960 film)
 Seetharama Kalyanam (1986 film)